White Oak is a borough in Allegheny County, Pennsylvania, United States. The population was 7,630 at the 2020 census.

White Oak was named for a stand of white oak trees near the original town site.

History
White Oak was originally part of Versailles Township (one of the original townships of Allegheny County). It wasn't until March 21, 1948, that a petition requesting the formation of White Oak Borough was submitted to the County Court. On June 24, 1948, Judge Russell H. Adams signed the decree of incorporation of the new borough. The first borough building was located at 860 Maple Street inside the old Bowery School.

Geography
White Oak is located at  (40.344869, -79.813202).

Surrounding neighborhoods
White Oak has five borders, including North Versailles Township to the north, North Huntingdon Township in Westmoreland County to the east, South Versailles Township to the southwest, Elizabeth Township to the south (in which a short part of the border runs across the Youghiogheny River), and McKeesport to the west.

Emergency services
The borough maintains its own police department consisting of twelve full-time officers and eight patrol cars. Two volunteer fire departments serve the borough: White Oak VFC No. 1 and Rainbow VFC. Emergency Medical Services are provided by White Oak EMS www.whiteoakems.com

Demographics

As of the census of 2000, there were 8,437 people, 3,678 households, and 2,390 families residing in the borough. The population density was 1,265.4 people per square mile (488.4/km2). There were 3,821 housing units at an average density of 573.1 per square mile (221.2/km2). The racial makeup of the borough was 97.20% White, 1.86% African American, 0.01% Native American, 0.36% Asian, 0.01% Pacific Islander, 0.12% from other races, and 0.44% from two or more races. Hispanic or Latino of any race were 0.40% of the population.

There were 3,678 households, out of which 22.4% had children under the age of 18 living with them, 52.9% were married couples living together, 9.5% had a female householder with no husband present, and 35.0% were non-families. 31.6% of all households were made up of individuals, and 17.3% had someone living alone who was 65 years of age or older. The average household size was 2.25 and the average family size was 2.84.

In the borough the population was spread out, with 17.8% under the age of 18, 7.7% from 18 to 24, 24.5% from 25 to 44, 26.1% from 45 to 64, and 23.9% who were 65 years of age or older. The median age was 45 years. For every 100 females there were 89.8 males. For every 100 females age 18 and over, there were 87.1 males.

The median income for a household in the borough was $38,046, and the median income for a family was $47,019. Males had a median income of $37,761 versus $27,378 for females. The per capita income for the borough was $20,775. About 4.0% of families and 5.3% of the population were below the poverty line, including 8.1% of those under age 18 and 3.4% of those age 65 or over.

Officials
As of 2016, the borough government includes Mayor Ina Jean Marton; council president Ron Massung; council vice president Joe Nagy; council president pro tempore David Pasternak; councilmen Ed Babyak, Charles Davis, Kenneth Robb, and C. Richard Bryce; district magistrate Tom Miller; and emergency management coordinator J. Mark Jones.

The borough is part of the Pennsylvania Senate District 45, represented by Jim Brewster and is part of the Pennsylvania House of Representatives District 35, Currently represented by Austin Davis (politician).

Government and politics

Schools
Francis McClure Middle School  
Twin Rivers Intermediate School                                                                              
Founders' Hall Middle School                                        
McKeesport Area High School (in McKeesport)
Mary of Nazareth Catholic School

Places of Worship 
Bridge City Church
Bryn Mawr Church of Christ
Faith Lutheran Church
Gemilas Chesed Synagogue
Gospel Hall Assembly
Greek Orthodox Church Annunciation
Prayer Time Cathedral
Sampson's Mills Presbyterian Church
St. Angela Merici Church
Temple B'nai Israel
Wesley United Methodist Church

References

External links

Borough website

Populated places established in 1778
Boroughs in Allegheny County, Pennsylvania